Dennis Chidi Isizoh (born 24 January 1956) is a Nigerian prelate who serves as the bishop of the Roman Catholic Diocese of Aguleri. Bishop Isizoh is an alumnus of both Pontifical Biblical Institute (Biblicum) and Pontifical Gregorian University, Rome where he studied Scriptural Sciences and Biblical Theology respectively. He was formerly the auxillary Bishop of Roman Catholic Archdiocese of Onitsha.

Publications
Cardinal Francis Arinze:The Church Pathfinder of Dialogue and Communion
The attitude of the Catholic church towards African traditional culture: 100 experts from the magisterial and other important church documents
 resurrected Jesus preached in Athens : the Areopagus speech (Acts 17, 16-34) ; an inquiry into the reasons for the Greek reaction to the speech and a reading of the text from the African traditional religious perspective.

Reference

People from Anambra State
Nigerian Roman Catholics
Igbo people
Living people